The women's singles of the 2010 ECM Prague Open tournament was played on clay in Prague, Czech Republic.

Sybille Bammer was the defending champion, but chose not to participate.
Ágnes Szávay defeated Barbora Záhlavová-Strýcová in the final (6–2, 1–6, 6–2).

Seeds

Draw

Finals

Top half

Bottom half

External links
Main Draw
Qualifying Draw

ECM Prague Open - Singles
2010 - Singles